11C-UCB-J is a PET tracer for imaging the synaptic vesicle glycoprotein 2A in the human brain.

It is used to study the brain changes associated with several diseases including Alzheimer's disease, schizophrenia, and depression.

References

PET radiotracers